Marcos Castellanos is a municipio (municipality) in the Mexican state of Michoacán near the southern shore of Lake Chapala. The municipal seat is the city of San José de Gracia.

Municipalities of Michoacán